Cottonmouth is a fictional villain appearing in American comic books published by Marvel Comics.

Publication history
Cottonmouth is a snake-themed super villain, mainly associated with the Serpent Society. He first appeared in Captain America #310 (Oct. 1985), created by writer Mark Gruenwald and artist Paul Neary. Burchell Clemens was artificially enhanced and given the ability to extend his jaw to over a foot and bite through solid materials such as concrete. He first showed up as part of the Serpent Society, often teaming up with Society member Asp. The team came into conflict with Captain America during a paid hit on MODOK After being arrested Society leader Sidewinder freed Cottonmouth and others from custody. When Viper took control of the Serpent Society Cottonmouth was one of the members who opposed her, siding with Captain America to take Viper down. Cottonmouth remained a member when the Serpent Society was reorganized as Serpent Solutions.

Fictional character biography
Originally from Mobile, Alabama, Cottonmouth was chosen by Sidewinder to join a snake-themed villain group, the Serpent Society. With the ability to extend his jaws over a foot wide, he was given steel fangs, possibly by the Roxxon Oil Company, which he uses to torture his victims in an almost cannibalistic way. His jaw muscles are superhumanly strong, and can bite with sufficient force to crush cinderblock or metals that are softer than iron. However, very little is known about his past, other than the fact that he was an active criminal in the southern portion of the United States.

Cottonmouth was often paired up with Asp, such as when the two were to advertise the Serpent Society to Kingpin. The Serpent Society was hired by A.I.M. to hunt down MODOK. During their confrontation with MODOK, Cottonmouth and teammate Death Adder were able to slay him, which was a big win for their organization. Cottonmouth also battled Captain America for the first time. They were soon defeated by Captain America, but were able to escape. He also participated in the mission to retrieve the retired Porcupine's costume, which turned out to be a trap by Captain America. Cottonmouth was injured during the battle, his teeth being destroyed by the star-spangled hero's shield. He, along with teammates Rattler and Death Adder were eventually defeated and taken into custody. Not for long, however, as Sidewinder soon teleported them to safety. Cottonmouth and Rattler next confronted the Kingpin's men over Death Adder's murder.

During the Viper's invasion, Cottonmouth sided with Diamondback and the other members who refused to take the leadership away from Sidewinder. He later betrayed Diamondback, attempting to bite her head off after she saved him, proving that his loyalties lied with Viper. He fought Steve Rogers as The Captain during this confrontation. Cottonmouth participated in the Serpent Society's mission to recover mystic objects for Ghaur and Llyra, and battled Psylocke and Storm of the X-Men. He voted against Diamondback during the Serpent Society's trial against her. Alongside the Serpent Society, he combatted Captain America. Paladin, and Diamondback.

He has also battled other super-heroes such as Black Panther and Luke Cage. He was eventually imprisoned, but escaped with Hawkeye, Plant-Man, and Headlok in Thunderbolts. He took Bushmaster's real name, Quincy McIver though his actual name has not been revealed.

Cottonmouth was later tracked down by American Eagle in Arizona. Several Serpent Society members including Anaconda, Black Mamba, Bushmaster and Cottonmouth, fought members of the New Avengers in a semi-tropical locale. Cottonmouth was defeated by Wolverine.

Cottonmouth has been seen working with the Serpent Society on several occasions. During an encounter with Deadpool, Cottonmouth was shot in the skull.

He somehow recovered during the "Avengers vs. X-Men" storyline as he was seen robbing a bank with the Society, where he was defeated by mutant Hope Summers.

As part of the "All-New, All-Different Marvel", Cottonmouth appears as a member of Viper's Serpent Society under its new name Serpent Solutions. He alongside Black Racer and Copperhead attacked Captain America and Diamondback where Captain America learned too late that Diamondback is a member of Serpent Solutions where she knocks him out and brings him to Serpent Solutions' headquarters.

During the "Opening Salvo" part of the "Secret Empire" storyline, Cottonmouth (along with Serpent Solutions) is recruited by Baron Helmut Zemo to join his Army of Evil.

In a prelude to the "Hunted" storyline, several members of the Serpent Society were captured by Kraven the Hunter, Taskmaster, and Black Ant and forced to participate in a murderous hunt set up by Arcade. Black Mamba, Cottonmouth, Bushmaster, Black Racer, Puff Adder, Rock Python, and Fer-de-Lance were placed in electric cages to wait for the hunt to commence. Black Mamba and Cottonmouth talked about their opinion that Viper is not suited to lead the Serpent Society. They are saved from the Hunter-Bots by Vulture.

Powers and abilities
Due to bionic reconstruction, Cottonmouth possesses enhanced jaw and neck muscles, and steel teeth enabling him to bite with sufficient force to crush cinderblock or deform metals softer than iron, hang from a rope by his teeth for up to an hour, and to open his mouth larger than the size of a human head.

In other media
 Cottonmouth appears in Marvel Disk Wars: The Avengers as a member of the Serpent Society.
 Cottonmouth appears as a playable character in Lego Marvel's Avengers.

References

External links
 Coppermouth II at Marvel.com
 

Characters created by Mark Gruenwald
Characters created by Paul Neary
Comics characters introduced in 1985
Cyborg supervillains
Fictional characters from Alabama
Fictional mercenaries in comics
Marvel Comics cyborgs
Marvel Comics male supervillains
Marvel Comics mutates
Marvel Comics supervillains